Mike Belitsky is a Canadian musician. He has played drums for a number of bands, including Jellyfishbabies, Jale, Neko Case, and Pernice Brothers, and later The Sadies.

Early life
Belitsky was born in Toronto, Ontario. He attended Concordia University in Montreal.

Career

Belitsky left Concordia in 1987 to join the band Jellyfishbabies, who relocated to Toronto. He later moved to Halifax, drumming in punk bands. In 1996 he became a member of the band Jale, and drummed on their second album, So Wound. A year later he performed at the New York Pop Explosion festival with the band Cheticamp.

By 2004 he was playing with the band Unintended as well as The Sadies.

In 2013 he joined the band The New Mendicants. He toured Spain with the group in 2014, and drummed on their 2014 album Into the Lime.

In 2018 Belitsky injured his shoulder while ice skating, and was unable to perform for several months. Since that time he has continued to play in The Sadies, The Unintended, and The New Mendicants.

Album appearances
Neko Case - Fox Confessor Brings the Flood (2006, Anti-)

References

Canadian rock drummers
Canadian male drummers
Living people
Musicians from Halifax, Nova Scotia
Musicians from Toronto
Year of birth missing (living people)
Concordia University alumni